Soup for One is a 1982 American sex comedy film directed and written by Jonathan Kaufer and produced by Marvin Worth. While the film was a box-office failure (mostly due to mixed reviews over its gratuitous sex scenes, including one involving S&M), it is best remembered for its soundtrack, which was produced by Nile Rodgers and Bernard Edwards of the group Chic, who performed the title track.

Plot
Allan, a cable television producer in New York City, is determined to find the perfect woman, and he even goes so far as having a description of what she would look like done on an artist sketch. Before he can encounter the girl of his dreams. he finds himself encountering a series of disastrous dating roadblocks. He finally meets Maria, who seems to be his perfect woman, and tries to make the relationship work.

Cast
 Saul Rubinek as Allan Martin
 Marcia Strassman as Maria Giannini
 Gerrit Graham as Brian Reed
 Teddy Pendergrass as Night Club Singer 
 Richard Libertini as Angelo Giannini
 Andrea Martin as Concord Seductress 
 Mordecai Lawner as Furniture Salesman 
 Lewis J. Stadlen as Allan's Father 
 Joanna Merlin as Allan's Mother 
 Christine Baranski as Blonde in Bar 
 Ellen March as Blind Date 
 Maury Chaykin as Dr. Wexler 
 Deborah Offner as Girl in Neon Bedroom 
 Michael Jeter as Mr. Kelp 
 Anna Deavere Smith as Deborah 
 Laura Dean as Linda 
 Marley Friedman as Zak 
 Andrew Friedman as Zak 
 Jessica James as Miss Farr 
 Kate Lynch as WPCP Receptionist 
 Suzzy Roche as Girl #1 
 Claudia Cron as Girl #2 
 Cheri Jamison as Girl #3 
 Hilary Shepard as Girl #4 
 Libby Boone as Girl #5 
 Catherine Lee Smith as Girl #6 
 Marisa Smith as Concord Dental Assistant 
 Jaime Tirelli as WPCP Announcer 
 Cristina San Juan as WPCP Weathergirl 
 James Rebhorn as Lawyer 
 Ron Faber as Man with Video Tapes 
 Gloria Cromwell as Mrs. Franken 
 Thomas Quinn as Police Officer 
 Rick Lieberman as Sketch Artist 
 Ellie Covan as Concord Registration Woman 
 Bo Rucker as Man in Washington Sq. Park 
 Jack Chandler as Stoned Cameraman 
 Michael Pearlman as Young Allan 
 Lauren Sautner as Young Rhonda 
 Karen Werner as Receptionist  
 Maggie Wheeler as Nurse 
 Max Gulak as Italian Waiter 
 William Cuellar as Chief Running Brook 
 Mitchell Jason as Judge 
 Sherrie Bender as Topless Girl at Door 
 Kim Chan as Harold the Cook 
 Linda Ray as Sally in Pool 
 Lisa Parker as A Girl in Pool 
 Merwin Goldsmith as Mr. Blum 
 Olivia K. Le'Aauanae as Fire Knife Dancer 
 Victor Truro as Man at Cellmates 
 Anthony Cesare as Man at River Cafe 
 Marvin Beck as Wedding Guest (uncredited) 
 Jennifer Delora as Girl at Bar (uncredited)

Soundtrack

In addition to "Soup for One" (Pop #80, R&B #14), Chic performed and produced four other cuts from the soundtrack: "Open Up", "Tavern on the Green", "I Work for a Living", and "Riding". "I Want Your Love" (Pop #7, R&B #5), which also is included, was a 1979 recording. Rodgers and Edwards wrote and produced three songs for the film, one by Teddy Pendergrass ("Dream Girl"; he performs this in a cameo as a night club singer), another by Sister Sledge ("Let's Go on Vacation") and one for Carly Simon ("Why") (UK #10). Debbie Harry contributed a song to the soundtrack, titled "Jump Jump". The album, released on WEA/Mirage Records, was released in 2015 on compact disc.

External links 
 
 
 

1982 films
1982 romantic comedy films
American sex comedy films
Films about television
Films set in New York City
Warner Bros. films
1980s sex comedy films
1980s English-language films
1980s American films